Jules Crickx (26 May 1894 – ?) was a Belgian rowing coxswain. He competed at the 1920 Summer Olympics in Antwerp with the men's eight where they were eliminated in round one. At times he competed alongside his twin-brother Julien.

References

1894 births
Date of death missing
Belgian male rowers
Olympic rowers of Belgium
Rowers at the 1920 Summer Olympics
Coxswains (rowing)